CJAT-FM (Bounce Radio) is a Canadian radio station that broadcasts an adult hits format at 95.7 FM in Trail, British Columbia and is also heard in Castlegar at 90.3 FM and Grand Forks at 103.3 FM, including other rebroadcasters.

History
The station began broadcasting in 1933 and has changed many frequencies until its last AM frequency at 610 kHz in 1941. CFKC operates at 1340 kHz in Creston, which was launched in 1968. As of 1989, CFKC Creston became a full-time rebroadcaster of CJAT Trail. The station was originally an affiliate of the Canadian Radio Broadcasting Commission and then affiliated with the Canadian Broadcasting Corporation when it was formed in 1936. The station would remain affiliated with CBC, including its Trans-Canada Network from 1944 to 1962 and then its successor CBC Radio until 1977.

In 1994, the station received CRTC approval to convert CJAT Trail from the AM band to the FM band at 95.7 MHz. On June 30, 2006, CJAT received approval to add new FM transmitters at Castlegar which would operate at 90.3 MHz and Grand Forks at 103.3 MHz.

Over the years, CJAT went through various formats and ownerships and is currently owned by Bell Media, which rebranded the station with the EZ Rock format on October 5, 2011, and then with the Bounce format on May 18, 2021.

References

External links
 Bounce Radio
 
 
 

JAT
JAT
JAT
Radio stations established in 1933
1933 establishments in British Columbia
Canadian Radio Broadcasting Commission
Trail, British Columbia